Severe Tropical Cyclone John was an intense tropical cyclone that rapidly deepened offshore before devastating areas of Western Australia. The system was the second cyclone and first severe tropical cyclone of the active 1999–00 Australian region cyclone season. Cyclone John developed from a monsoon trough positioned northwest of Australia on 9 December 1999. As it moved to the west and later south as the result of a subtropical ridge under favourable conditions, the cyclone was able to rapidly intensify. John reached peak intensity on 14 December as a Category 5 cyclone on the Australian cyclone scale, the highest rating possible. Cyclone John later began interacting with a mid–latitude trough, which slightly weakened the cyclone prior to making landfall near Whim Creek early on 15 December. Increasingly unfavourable conditions further inland resulted in the cyclone's rapid weakening, before it dissipated during the next day.

Cyclone John extensively affected areas of Western Australia, but damage was not as bad as expected. Widespread power outages across the Pilbara region were caused by John. Strong winds caused minor damage to infrastructure across the coast, as well as tree damage. 140 windmills were destroyed by the cyclone on the coast. Further inland, rainfall associated with the cyclone and its remnants brought flooding, which flooded 25 houses and caused rivers to overflow. The system was responsible for no deaths and a limited amount of damage. After the season, the name John was retired from the Australian tropical cyclone naming list.

Meteorological history

In early December, a monsoon trough north of Australia intensified due to a strong northwest cross–equatorial surge in the South China Sea. This resulted in the formation of a tropical low southwest of Timor on 9 December. At 0600 UTC on 10 December, the Joint Typhoon Warning Center (JTWC) began to monitor the system, designating it as 02S. As it moved towards the west and subsequently southwards, improving upper–air divergence allowed the system to intensify, reaching tropical cyclone intensity on the evening of 11 December and thus attaining the name John. At the time, a Tropical Rainfall Measuring Mission (TRMM) pass of the system revealed a compact system, with a convective rainband tightly surrounding a central cloud–filled eye. A developed anticyclone positioned over the system provided favorable conditions for development. Due to the presence of a subtropical ridge to the east over Australia, Cyclone John was forecast to generally move in a south-southwestward direction.

Steadily intensifying, the cyclone attained Category 3 cyclone intensity on the Australian cyclone scale at 1600 UTC on 12 December. TRMM imagery indicated that the cyclone had developed a banding eye feature, and had good outflow and a symmetric structure.

However, after peak intensity, dry air began to become wrapped into the northwestern quadrant of the system. Moving towards the Australian coastline, radar imagery from Dampier, Western Australia showed a strong eyewall associated with John. Cyclone John began to become elongated along a northwest–southeast axis as it neared the coast. The cyclone also began interacting with a mid–latitude trough the southwest. This generated some vertical wind shear, which weakened John slightly and caused it to curve towards the southeast. The entirety of the cyclone's eye crossed the coast by 0200 UTC as the storm moved further inland into an area of wind shear and dry air, which caused it to rapidly weaken. The cyclone was last noted by TCWC Perth and the JTWC on 16 December as it dissipated overland.

Preparations and impact

Prior to Cyclone John's landfall, hundreds of people were evacuated from homes, primarily in Karratha, where two shelters were set up. In Point Samson, 500 people evacuated to shelters in Wickham, Western Australia. TCWC Perth began issuing hourly warnings for potentially affected areas beginning at 1400 UTC on 14 December. As the storm made landfall, some residents of Whim Creek took refuge in a shipping container.

Strong winds from the cyclone caused widespread power outages to areas in Pilbara. Karratha suffered minor damage from John, primarily in the form of wind damage. Various trees were uprooted by strong winds, and some homes suffered minor roof damage. Palm fronds in Karratha were blown off palm trees due to strong winds. In Whim Creek, where the cyclone had made landfall, the top floor of a 113-year-old pub and hotel was destroyed. A temporary roof made up of tarpaulins later collapsed in a flood event the following month. 140 windmills between Whim Creek and Newman were destroyed by the cyclone.

Offshore, 220 cattle aboard a ship died after the ship was battered by rough seas associated with Cyclone John. Production from an oil field off the coast of northwest Australia were down 38%, partly due to being shut down in preparation for Cyclone John. Further inland, Cyclone John brought widespread rainfall and flooding. In Newman, Western Australia,  of rain was recorded early on 16 December. As a result, some roads and 25 houses were flooded by the rains. Todd River was flooded after  of rain fell as a result of the cyclone. Overall John was responsible for no deaths and a limited amount of damage. After the season had ended the name John was retired from the Australian tropical cyclone naming list.

See also

Tropical cyclones in 1999
Other storms named John
Cyclone Orson
Cyclone Joan
Cyclone George
Cyclone Gwenda

References

External links
Bureau of Meteorology
 Joint Typhoon Warning Center (JTWC) 
 Track of Cyclone John (provided by Australia Severe Weather)

John, cyclone
John
John
John